Say Yes to the Dress is an American reality television series on TLC which follows events at Kleinfeld Bridal in Manhattan. The series shows the progress of individual sales associates, managers, and fitters at the store, along with profiling brides as they search for the perfect wedding dress.  Common themes include overwhelming advice of friends and family, the ability of the "perfect dress" to help a bride overcome personal difficulty, struggle with weight and body image concerns, and the challenge of staying in budget, especially in the case of dresses by Kleinfeld's exclusive designer, Pnina Tornai (one of the few designers ever mentioned by name in the show).  Dresses sold on the show range from $1,300 to $40,000.

Cast

Mara Urshel
Mara Urshel is one of the co-owners of Kleinfeld. Earlier in her career in the retail industry, she served as senior vice president and general merchandise manager at Saks Fifth Avenue. She worked there for twenty years. After she left Saks, she was employed by Casual Corner and Geoffrey Beene Company in executive management positions. She then purchased the Kleinfeld Bridal store with Ronald Rothstein and Wayne Rogers on July 9, 1999.

Ronald Rothstein
Ronald (Ronnie) Rothstein is one of the co-owners of Kleinfeld. He was successful academically; he graduated from Wharton School at the University of Pennsylvania in 1964 and received his law degree from the University of Miami in 1968. He then became a member of the Florida Bar. In 1976, he started his own consumer products company named Oh Dawn, but after eight years, he sold Oh Dawn to an American Stock Exchange company. He did however stay on in an executive capacity for several more years. On July 9, 1999 he purchased the Kleinfeld Bridal store with Mara Urshel and Wayne Rogers.

Randy Fenoli

Randy Fenoli was the Fashion Director for Kleinfeld. He was born in Mt. Vernon, Illinois, and grew up with a love of fashion. He began sewing dresses when he was only nine years old. When he got older, he branched out into the areas of make-up artistry, hair styling, and entertainment. He then enrolled with the New York's Fashion Institute of Technology. Later, he was offered a job working for Paul Diamond of The Diamond Collection. He was then offered a job at Kleinfeld where he worked until 2012. He is now an independent consultant.

Dorothy Silver
Dorothy Silver is the Director of Sales and Merchandising for Kleinfeld. She began her career in New York as a floor manager at Bonwit Teller, but she has spent the majority of her twenty-five years in the retail industry at Kleinfeld. She works alongside Nicole Sacco and Joan Roberts.

Nicole Sacco
Nicole Sacco is the Director of Fittings and Sales at Kleinfeld. She has worked there for thirteen years and has many responsibilities, primarily helping consultants with their clients, whether it's finding a dress, closing the sale, or just making sure the client is happy. She works alongside Dorothy Silver and Joan Roberts.

Nitsa Glezelis
Nitsa Glezelis is the Director of Alterations at Kleinfeld. She was born in Kos, Greece, and has been in the retail industry since she was twelve years old. She has worked at Kleinfeld for eighteen years. She works alongside Vera Skenderis.

Joan Roberts
Joan Roberts is the Director of Sales/Bridal Manager at Kleinfeld. Before coming to Kleinfeld, she had worked in the retail industry for twenty five years. She works alongside Nicole Sacco and Dorothy Silver.

Camille Coffey
Camille Coffey is one of the several bridal consultants at Kleinfeld. She was first introduced to Kleinfeld when she was shopping for a dress to wear to her son's wedding. She applied for a job and has been working there ever since.

Vera Skenderis
Vera Skenderis is the Alterations Manager at Kleinfeld. She was born in Athens, Greece. She has been working in the retail industry for thirty-four years. She works alongside Nitsa Glezelis.

Audrey Pisani
Audrey Pisani is one of the several bridal consultants at Kleinfeld. She was born in Brooklyn and has worked in the retail industry for twenty years. Fifteen of those years has been spent working in bridal wear.

Keasha Rigsby
Keasha Rigsby is one of the several bridal consultants at Kleinfeld. She has been working in the retail industry for fifteen years. Six of those years has been spent working in bridal wear. She was first introduced to Kleinfeld when she was shopping for wedding dresses with her cousin. She met one of the co-owners, Ronnie Rothstein, applied for a job, and has been working there ever since.   Keasha has not appeared on Say Yes to the Dress since the January 2011 season.  She will be appearing on a new show entitled Keasha’s Perfect Dress on the Canadian Slice network. This show will follow Keasha as she opens a new bridal salon.

Debbie Asprea
Debbie Asprea is one of the several bridal consultants at Kleinfeld. She has been working in the retail industry for eighteen years. She has been with Kleinfeld for fifteen of those eighteen years. She attributes her love of fashion to her father, who was a dress contractor.

Episodes

Spinoffs
Say Yes to the Dress: Atlanta (July–September 2010; July 2011–) is the first spinoff, which focuses on Bridals by Lori, a bridal shop in Atlanta, Georgia. Other than the shop, staff and production company (NorthSouth Productions produced the Atlanta series), the elements are the same as the original series. The Atlanta series itself also led to two spinoffs:
Say Yes to the Dress: Bridesmaids (July 2011–) is a spinoff focused on bridesmaid dresses and the bridesmaid showroom at Bridals by Lori.
Say Yes to the Dress: Monte's Take (July 2011 – February 2012) is a podcast hosted by Monte Durham, the bridal image consultant at Bridals by Lori; and TLC Interactive Producer Candace Keener. The weekly podcast provides listeners wedding tips and tricks.
Say Yes to the Dress: Big Bliss (September–October 2010; April 2011–) is the second spin-off. The shop, staff, venue and producers are the same as the original series, except that all of Kleinfeld's clientele on this program are brides that are plus-sized.
Say Yes to the Dress: Randy Knows Best (April 2011–August 2013): Randy Fenoli, Kleinfeld's fashion director, uses top ten lists and past episode clips to share his tips on a variety of bridal categories.
Randy to the Rescue (June 2012–August 2013): Randy Fenoli travels across the country where lucky brides-to-be get a special consultation with Randy, where he will give a few pointers on how to improve their bridal style.
Say Yes to the Dress: Australia (2016): An international adaptation of the format on TLC Australia, featuring couture wedding gown designer Adam Dixon. The series is the first local production on the channel.
Say Yes to the Dress: UK (2016) the second international adaptation that premiered on TLC UK
Say Yes to the Dress: Ireland (2017) which premiered on RTÉ 2.
Say Yes to the Dress: Asia (2017) was also created for TLC Asia, shot in Malaysia with Malaysian hosts, featuring 18 Southeast Asian women and their dresses.
Say Yes to the Dress: Benelux
Say Yes: Wedding SOS (January 2018–) is a wedding makeover spin-off series focusing on transforming couples who have let themselves go.
Say Yes to the Dress: Canada (known in the US as Say Yes to the Dress: Northern Edition)
Say Yes to the Dress: America (January 2020): A 10-episode event series that featured couples representing each U.S. state, Puerto Rico, and Washington, D.C., and concluded with a mass wedding in New York City with all 52 couples, officiated by Fenoli.
Say Yes to the Dress: India (Dec 8, 2021)
Say Yes to the Vegas Dress
Say Yes to the Dress: The Big Day
Say Yes to the Dress: Lancashire (known in the US as Say Yes to the Dress: England)
Say Yes to the Dress: Finland
Say Yes to the Dress: Dubai (aka Say Yes to the Dress: Arabia)
Say Yes to the Dress: In Sickness and in Health
Say Yes to the Dress: Poland
Say Yes to the Dress: Spain
Say Yes to the Dress: Danmark
Say Yes to the Dress: Since the Big Day

References

External links

Kleinfeld Bridal
Bridals by Lori
Pnina Tornai
Say Yes to the Dress: Monte's Take Podcast

2000s American reality television series
2007 American television series debuts
2010s American reality television series
Television shows set in New York City
TLC (TV network) original programming
Wedding television shows
Wedding dresses